Charles Brown Crawford (May 7, 1884 – March 17, 1951) was an American football coach.  He served as the head football coach at the  University of Virginia for one season, in 1910, compiling a record of 6–2.  Crawford was later a pediatrician in Washington, D.C. He was buried in Alexandria, Virginia.

Head coaching record

References

External links
 

1884 births
1951 deaths
American pediatricians
Virginia Cavaliers football coaches
Physicians from Washington, D.C.